Margaret Campbell Speke Cruwys née Abercrombie (20 October 1894 – 12 March 1968) was an archivist and Devon historian. She was born in Ayr, Ayrshire, Scotland, and was the daughter of Alexander Houghton Abercrombie, an officer in the 21st Royal Scots Fusiliers. She married Lewis George Cruwys of Cruwys Morchard, Devon, on 19 November 1917 at St David's Church, Exeter. She became a member of the Devonshire Association in 1931 and was elected President in 1952. She was a member of the Devon and Exeter Institution, serving first as their secretary and then as president. Cruwys was editor of Devon and Cornwall Notes and Queries for thirty years. She was awarded a Fellowship of the Society of Antiquaries of London in 1950 for the work she did indexing and cataloguing the large collection of family papers held at Cruwys Morchard House. She died on 12 March 1968 at 31 St Peter Street, Tiverton, Devon, and was buried on 18 March 1968 at the Church of the Holy Cross, Cruwys Morchard, Devon.

Work
 The Diary of John Cruwys of Cruwys Morchard (1682-8). Devon and Cornwall Notes & Queries, Vol. XVIII, (1933-4), pp. 259–264.
 A Cruwys Morchard Notebook, 1066-1874. Exeter: J. Townsend & Sons, 1939.
 Records at Cruwys Morchard [presidential address], Trans. Dev. Assoc. 84, 1952, pp. 1–19.
 The Register of Baptisms, Marriages and Burials of the parish of St Andrew's Plymouth, Co. Devon, A.D. 1581-1618, with baptisms 1619-1633. Exeter: Devon and Cornwall Record Society, 1938-1954.

References

 Stéphan, D.J. Mrs. M. C. S. Cruwys: A Memoir. Devon and Cornwall Notes and Queries Vol. 31 (1968–70), pp. 33–34.
 Cruwys one-name study

1894 births
1968 deaths
Historians of Devon
20th-century British historians
British women historians
Female archivists
20th-century British women writers